Hibiscus radiatus (commonly known as monarch rosemallow) is native to southern and southeast Asia. It has  mauve flowers that have a purple center and yellow anthers. Leaves are dentate, with upper leaves lobed into three, five, or seven parts. Leaves are mistaken as marijuana, but radiatus' stems have small thorns. It is frequently grown as a vegetable or medicinal herb.

References

radiatus
Taxa named by Antonio José Cavanilles